The geographical term alfoz (plural alfoces) was used in the Iberian Peninsula during the Middle Ages to describe the rural territory, including subordinate hamlets, under the jurisdiction of a corresponding town (villa in Spanish). The villa and its alfoz, under the authority of the town's local council (concejo), sometimes underpinned what was called a Comunidad de Villa y Tierra, an autonomous political division. At the center of this community, the town (or sometimes a city) comprised an urban area and usually boasted of a castle and a fortified wall.

By the 12th century, the alfoces had fiscal, judicial and military functions. Furthermore, they lent themselves to the communal use of land for silvopastoral agriculture; however, in the year 1100, monarchs began to allocate portions of land to the Church and the nobility, an act that undermined the very purpose of the alfoz.

The alfoz and its villa formed what would later be known as a municipality. The word alfoz comes from the Arabic al-hawz, meaning "rural district". It is currently preserved in several placenames in Spain as well as is occasionally used as a modern-day common noun.

Notes

References

Bibliography
 
 

Geography terminology
Medieval Spain